Herbert Koziol (1903 in Vienna - 1986 in Igls, Tyrol) was professor of English historical linguistics at the University of Vienna's Department of English from 1961. Koziol was Karl Luick's successor from 1961. Koziol belonged to one of several generations of German-speaking English linguists who published cutting-edge research on English in the German language (see Select Publications).

Education 
Koziol received his doctorate, Dr. phil. in 1926 for the University of Vienna in Germanisitk and Anglistik. He subsequently worked as a Gymnasium teacher from 1927 to 1932, when he published his "Habilitation" (second book) in English Historical Linguistics (University of Vienna); he is thus an immediate successor of Karl Luick (deceased in 1935). From 1945 to 1961, Koziol was Full Professor of English Historical Linguistics at the University of Graz before, in 1961, he took a call to Vienna to hold  the "Luick" Chair in English Historical Linguistics (succeeded by Gero Bauer, Herbert Schendl and, currently, Nikolaus Ritt). Koziol is primarily known for his revision of Luick's standard work in English historical grammar (1935–40) and in English word formation (1937, 1972).

Select publications 
Editor and author of the revised version of Karl Luick's Historische Grammatik der englischen Sprache (1935-1940)

Grammatik der englischen Sprache (1968)

Englische Wortbildungslehre, 2nd ed. (1972)

Honours 
Member of the Austrian Academy of Sciences (1961)

Festschrift Prof. Dr. Herbert Koziol zum siebzigsten Geburtstag, ed. by Gero Bauer, Franz K Stanzel and Franz Zaic. New Academic Press (1973).

Wilhelm Hartel Prize (1973)

Notable students 
 Herbert Schendl

References

1903 births
1986 deaths
Historical linguists
Academic staff of the University of Vienna
Members of the Austrian Academy of Sciences